Kaundinya may refer to:
 Kaundinya is the first disciple and arahant of Gautama Buddha.
 Kaundinya I (Preah Thong), one of the legendary co-founders of the Kingdom of Funan.
 the name of a famous Rishi (Seer) of Ancient India.
 a Hindu Gotra or Clan name, named after the Rishi Kaundinya.  (A Gotra is used to identify oneself during Hindu religious ceremonies.)